George William Mann (born 31 July 1965) is a New Zealand-Tongan former professional rugby league footballer who played in the 1980s and 1990s, who represented both New Zealand and Tonga.

Background
George Mann is the cousin of the rugby league footballer; Duane Mann.

Playing career
A Mangere East junior, Mann played for Auckland, Newcastle, Leigh (Heritage No. 994), St. Helens, Leeds, Warrington and Widnes.

County Cup Final appearances
He also played in St. Helens' 4–5 defeat by Wigan in the 1992 Lancashire Cup Final during the 1992–93 season at Knowsley Road, St. Helens, on Sunday 18 October 1992.

International honours
Mann was a Tonga and New Zealand international and played for Tonga at the 1986 Pacific Cup and 1995 World Cup.

Retirement
His career was ended in 2000 by a high tackle from Oldham's Chris Holland, Mann suffered horrific facial injuries, including a broken jaw.

References

External links
(archived by web.archive.org) Profile at leedsrugby.dnsupdate.co.uk
(archived by web.archive.org) World Cup 1995 details
Profile at saints.org.uk

1965 births
Living people
Auckland rugby league team players
Leeds Rhinos players
Leigh Leopards players
Mangere East Hawks players
New Zealand national rugby league team players
New Zealand sportspeople of Tongan descent
New Zealand rugby league players
Newcastle Knights players
Otahuhu Leopards players
Rugby league props
Rugby league second-rows
St Helens R.F.C. players
Tonga national rugby league team players
Warrington Wolves players
Widnes Vikings players